Walt Whitman gave a series of lectures on Abraham Lincoln from 1879 to 1890. They centered around the assassination of Abraham Lincoln, but also covered years leading up to and during the American Civil War and sometimes included readings of poems such as "O Captain! My Captain!". The lectures began as a benefit for Whitman and were generally popular and well received.

Whitman greatly admired Lincoln and was moved by his assassination in 1865 to write several poems in the president's memory. The idea of Whitman's giving lectures about the topic was first circulated by his friend John Burroughs in an 1878 letter. Whitman, who had long aspired to be a lecturer, gave his first lecture in New York City on April 14 the following year. Over the course of the next eleven years, he gave the lecture at least ten more times, and possibly as many as twenty. A delivery of the lecture in 1887 at Madison Square Theatre is considered to have been his most successful lecture and had many prominent members of society in the audience. Whitman described the lecture as "the culminating hour" of his life, but later criticized it as "too much the New York Jamboree". He gave the lecture for the last time in Philadelphia in 1890, two years before his death.

The 1887 lecture was described by Whitman's biographer Justin Kaplan in 1980 as the closest Whitman came to "social eminence on a large scale".

Background 

Walt Whitman established his reputation as a poet in the late 1850s to early 1860s after the 1855 release of Leaves of Grass. The brief volume released in 1855 was considered controversial by some, with critics particularly objecting to Whitman's blunt depictions of sexuality and the poem's "homoerotic overtones". At the start of the American Civil War, Whitman moved from New York to Washington, D.C., where he held a series of government jobs—first with the Army Paymaster's Office and later with the Bureau of Indian Affairs. He volunteered in the army hospitals as a nurse.

Although they never met, Whitman saw Abraham Lincoln several times between 1861 and 1865, sometimes in close quarters. The first time was when Lincoln stopped in New York City in 1861 on his way to Washington. He greatly admired the President, writing in October 1863, "I love the President personally." Whitman later declared that "Lincoln gets almost nearer me than anybody else." Lincoln's assassination on April 15, 1865, greatly moved Whitman and the nation. Shortly after Lincoln's death, hundreds of poems were written on the topic. The historian Stephen B. Oates noted that "never had the nation mourned so over a fallen leader".

Whitman himself wrote four poems in tribute to the fallen President. "O Captain! My Captain!", "When Lilacs Last in the Dooryard Bloom'd", "Hush'd Be the Camps To-Day", and "This Dust Was Once the Man" were all written on Lincoln's death. While the poems do not specifically mention Lincoln, they turn the assassination of the President into a sort of martyrdom. In 1875 Whitman published Memoranda During the War, which included a narrative of Lincoln's death. The following year he published an article on Lincoln's death in The New York Sun, and considered writing a book on Lincoln, but never did.

Whitman and lectures 
In the mid-19th century, public lectures in the United States emerged as a place for prominent Americans to speak. As more high-profile people began lecturing, more Americans began attending lectures. Because of this, scholar David Haven Blake writes, the lecture became directly associated with celebrity and fame. By the 1870s, Whitman had long sought to be a lecturer, writing several lectures and delivering at least one as early as the 1850s.

In a letter written on February 3, 1878, Whitman's friend John Burroughs suggested that he deliver a lecture on Lincoln's assassination. Burroughs wrote that the poet Richard Watson Gilder also supported the idea and suggested delivery around the anniversary of the assassination, in April. On February 24, Whitman responded to Burroughs, agreeing to the proposal. The next month, Whitman began experiencing severe pain in his shoulder and was partially paralyzed; as a result, the lecture was postponed to May. On April 18 the paralysis was attributed to a ruptured blood vessel in his brain by the physician Silas Weir Mitchell and in May he gave up on plans for the lecture that year. In March 1879, a group of Whitman's friends, including Gilder, Burroughs, and the jeweler John H. Johnston, again began planning a lecture. As part of the preparations for the first lecture, Whitman worked his New York Sun article into a readable format.

Deliveries 
Between 1879 and 1890 Whitman delivered his lecture on the assassination of Lincoln a number of times. Money made from these lectures constituted a major source of income for him in the last years of his life.

The first lecture was given in Steck Hall, New York City, on April 14, 1879. Whitman was unable find further bookings for lectures for the rest of the year. He did not give another lecture until April 15, 1880, in Association Hall, Philadelphia. He revised the lecture's content slightly for the second reading; it would stay in largely the same form for the remainder of his lectures. Whitman gave the lecture again in 1881. There are no records of him delivering it in the next five years, but he gave it at least four times in 1886, and several times in the ensuing four years. Whitman's April 15, 1887 lecture at Madison Square Theatre is considered the most successful of the lectures, largely because it was attended by a number of notable figures. He gave the lecture at least two further times, including his last delivery in Philadelphia on April 14, 1890, just two years before his death.

Whitman said that he gave the lecture a total of thirteen times, but later scholars give varying numbersestimates range as high as twenty. Eleven individual deliveries have been identified:

Content 

Whitman was described by scholar Merrill D. Peterson as not being an orator "either in manner or appearance". Contemporary observers also described Whitman as a poor speaker, saying that his voice would become higher and "unnatural-sounding". However, other sources describe him as speaking in a low voice.

The lecture combined clippings of previously written material, such as the article Whitman had published on Lincoln's death in the New York Sun, Memoranda During the War, The Bride of Gettysburg by John Dunbar Hilton, and some new content. In preparing for the lecture, Whitman also considered the story of Demodocus, a divine bard portrayed in the Odyssey.

According to scholar Leslie Elizabeth Eckel, Whitman generally began by "downplaying his ability to handle the emotionally challenging task that lay before him". He then moved into describing the rise in tensions leading up to the 1860 presidential election and America during the Civil War era. Then he would describe Lincoln's death, the main focus of the lecture. Whitman described Ford's Theatre and the assassination in vivid detail, as if he had been there. He identified the assassination as a force that would "condenseA nationality," equating Lincoln's killing to a sacrifice which would "cement [...] the whole people."

Whitman brought a "reading book" with him to the lectures that contained fifteen poems he read at their conclusion. He often read his poem "O Captain! My Captain!", but the book contained five other poems from Leaves of Grass including "Proud Music of the Storm" and "To the Man-of-War-Bird". It also had clippings of the works of other poets such as "The Raven" by Edgar Allan Poe, poems by William Collins, and a translation of Anacreon's Ode XXXIII by Thomas Moore called "The Midnight Visitor". Whitman revised the text of "The Midnight Visitor" that he delivered.

Reception 
The lectures were popular and well received. Historian Daniel Mark Epstein wrote, "[t]he speech was always a success, and in major cities it seldom failed to reap columns of publicity in the newspapers," and scholar Michael C. Cohen called Whitman's lecture his "most popular text". In 1988 professor Kerry C. Larson wrote that the "hackneyed" sentimentality of Whitman's lectures was indicative of a decline in his creativity.

Because tickets were generally too expensive for the working class to attend, the lectures were not usually attended by the common people. According to Blake, they instead allowed members of higher society to "pay homage to both the president and the poet". He emphasizes how Whitman used the lectures to connect America's love for Lincoln with his own poetry, namely Leaves of Grass. Whitman's biographer Justin Kaplan wrote that Whitman's 1887 lecture in New York City and its aftermath marked the closest he came to "social eminence on a large scale", while Reynolds describes Whitman's lectures as making him a household name.

Many audience members reported being moved to tears. José Martí, a Cuban journalist who was present at one of the lectures, wrote a laudatory account of the lecture that was spread across Latin America. He described the crowd as listening "in religious silence, for its sudden grace notes, vibrant tones, hymnlike progress, and Olympian familiarity seemed at times the whispering of the stars." The poet Edmund Clarence Stedman wrote that "Something of Lincoln himself seemed to pass into this man who loved and studied him", while the poet Stuart Merrill said that Whitman's telling of the assassination convinced him that "I was there, [that] the very thing happened to me. And this recital was as gripping as the messengers' reports in Aeschylus."

Whitman also used the lectures to further perception of himself as a "public historian". Promotional materials for the lecture often falsely claimed that Whitman had known well Lincoln and had been in Ford's Theatre upon the night of the assassination. An ad for his Elkton, Maryland, lecture in 1886 even said that Whitman had been in the room with Lincoln when he was shot. English scholar Gregory Eiselein contrasted Whitman's depiction of Lincoln's death in his lectures with that in his poem "When Lilacs Last in the Dooryard Bloom'd." Whitman's lecture was intended to present a very factual account, in a tone that scholar Martin T. Buinicki has described as "pointedly historical". Conversely, "Lilacs" has what Eiselein describes as "musical, ethereal, often abstract, [and] heavily symbolized." Blake describes Whitman's lectures and the respect they received from high society as emphasizing a final "triumph" for Whitman, over the "slander and scorn" he had once experienced from the same group. He goes on to write that delivering the lecture regularly became "vital to his permanent achievement of [fame]."

Notes

References

Bibliography

External links 
 Daniel Mark Epstein on Walt Whitman's "The Death of Lincoln"
 Text of the "Death of Abraham Lincoln" lecture

19th-century speeches
Cultural depictions of Abraham Lincoln
Lists of speeches by speaker
Walt Whitman and Abraham Lincoln
Works by Walt Whitman
Lectures